The women's curling at the 2003 Asian Winter Games was held from February 5 to February 7, 2003 at Aomori City Sports Complex, Japan.

Squads

Results
All times are Japan Standard Time (UTC+09:00)

Preliminary

5 February, 12:00

5 February, 17:00

6 February, 10:00

Final round

Semifinal
7 February, 9:30

Final
7 February, 14:30

References

Tournament Page at World Curling

External links
Official website

Women